An Evening with Joe Henderson is a live album by American jazz saxophonist Joe Henderson recorded in Italy in 1987 and released on the Red label. It features Henderson in a trio with bassist Charlie Haden and drummer Al Foster.

Reception 

The AllMusic review by Scott Yanow states "Although Joe Henderson's pianoless trio recordings for Blue Note in 1985 received a fair amount of publicity, this similar date for the Italian Red label has been almost completely overlooked".

Track listing 
 Ask Me Now (Thelonious Monk) – 14:23
 Serenity (Joe Henderson) – 8:44
 Beatrice (Sam Rivers) – 10:44
 Invitation (Bronisław Kaper) – 13:20

Three additional tracks from the concert were made available for purchase as digital downloads in 2009 under the title More From An Evening With Joe Henderson. They are as follows:

 Visa (Charlie Parker)
 Rue Chaptal (also known as "Royal Roost" and "Tenor Madness" (Fats Navarro, Kenny Clarke)
 All the Things You Are (Jerome Kern, Oscar Hammerstein II)

Personnel 
Joe Henderson – tenor saxophone
Charlie Haden – bass
Al Foster – drums

References 

1987 live albums
Joe Henderson live albums
Red Records live albums